The Roman Catholic Archdiocese of Nampula is an archbishopric and the metropolitan see for one of the three ecclesiastical provinces in Mozambique in  Africa, yet still depends on the missionary Roman Congregation for the Evangelization of Peoples.

Its cathedral is the Catedral Metropolitana de Nossa Senhora de Fátima, dedicated to the diocesan patron saint Our Lady of Fatima, in Nampula.

History 
The Diocese of Nampula was established on September 4, 1940, by Pope Pius XII's papal bull Sollemnibus Conventionibus, on territory split off from the Territorial Prelature of Mozambique, which was simultaneously promoted and became its metropolitan as the Archdiocese of Lourenço Marques (now Maputo). Nampula lost land on April 5, 1957, to establish the Diocese of Porto Amélia (now its suffragan Pemba) and on July 21, 1963, to establish the Diocese of Vila Cabral (now its suffragan Lichinga)

On June 4, 1984, it was promoted to the Metropolitan Archdiocese of Nampula by Pope John Paul II's papal bull, Quo efficacius; he made a papal visit in September 1988.

Nampula lost territory on October 11, 1991, to establish the Diocese of Nacala as its suffragan.

Statistics 
As per 2014, it pastorally served 485,813 Catholics (13.7% of 3,547,000 total) on 51,000 km in 40 parishes and a mission with 75 priests (36 diocesan, 39 religious), 270 lay religious (96 brothers, 174 sisters) and 19 seminarians.

Ecclesiastical province 
Its suffragan sees were all daughters (comment refers to three dioceses in this province before Gurué was shifted here from another province) :
 Roman Catholic Diocese of Gurué
 Roman Catholic Diocese of Lichinga (formerly Vila Cabral)
 Roman Catholic Diocese of Nacala 
 Roman Catholic Diocese of Pemba (formerly Porto Amélia),

Episcopal ordinaries
(all Roman rite)

Suffragan Bishops of Nampula 
 Teófilo José Pereira de Andrade, Friars Minor (O.F.M.) (born Portugal) (1941.05.12 – retired 1951.02.17), emeritus as Titular Bishop of Urusi (1951.02.17 – death 1954.10.25)
 Manuel de Medeiros Guerreiro (?Portuguese) (1951.03.02 – retired 1966.11.30), previously Bishop of the Roman Catholic Diocese of São Tomé de Meliapor (India) (1937.04.10 – 1951.03.02); emeritus as Titular Bishop of Præcausa (1966.11.30 – resigned 1971.01.27), died 1978
 Manuel Vieira Pinto (1967.04.21 – 1984.06.04 see below), President of Episcopal Conference of Mozambique (1975 – 1976)

Metropolitan Archbishops of Nampula 
 Manuel Vieira Pinto (see above 1984.06.04 – retired 2000.11.16), also Apostolic Administrator of the suffragan Diocese of Pemba (Mozambique) (1992.12.12 – 1998.01.18)
 Auxiliary Bishop Germano Grachane, Lazarists (C.M.) (1990.01.22 – 1991.10.11), Titular Bishop of Thunusuda (1990.01.22 – 1991.10.11); later first bishop of suffragan daughter see Nacala (Mozambique) (1991.10.11 – ...)
 Tomé Makhweliha, Dehonians (S.C.I.) (2000.11.16 - retired 2016.07.25), also President of Episcopal Conference of Mozambique (2006 – 2009); previously Bishop of Pemba (Mozambique) (1997.10.24 – 2000.11.16) 
'' Apostolic Administrator Ernesto Maguengue (2016.07.25 - ...), while Titular Bishop of Furnos Minor (2014.08.06 – ...) as Auxiliary Bishop of Nampula (2014.08.06 – ...); previously Bishop of the Pemba (Mozambique) (2004.06.24 – 2012.10.27)
 Inácio Saure, Consolata Missionaries (I.M.C.) (2017.04.11 – ...), previously Bishop of the Tete (Mozambique) (2011.04.12 – 2017.04.11).

See also
 List of Catholic dioceses in Mozambique
 Roman Catholicism in Mozambique

References

Sources and external links 
 GCatholic.org - data for all sections

Roman Catholic dioceses in Mozambique
Nampula
1940 establishments in Mozambique
A